2015 IWRF European Championship was the 10th international European wheelchair rugby competition, taken place between 15 September to 19 September. The championships was contested between Europe's eight top national teams and was held at the Pajulahti Sports Institute in Nastola, Finland. The tournament was won by Great Britain, their fifth title.

The finalists of the competition, Great Britain and Sweden, won the two European qualification slots for the wheelchair rugby tournament at the 2016 Summer Paralympics in Rio.

Tournament
Eight teams contested the 2015 IWRF European Championship. The preliminary rounds consisted of a group stage where the teams were split into two leagues which were contested as a round-robin. The winner of group A then faced the second placed team from Group B and the winner of group B faced the second placed team from group A in elimination matches to determine the two finalists. The eventual winners, Great Britain, finished the competition unbeaten.

Preliminary round

Group A

Group B

Classification
Bracket

Medal round
Bracket

References

wheelchair rugby
2015–16 in European rugby union
wheelchair rugby
2015
2015 in wheelchair rugby